Grant Glacier is in Wenatchee National Forest in the U.S. state of Washington, in a cirque to the north of North Star Mountain.

See also
List of glaciers in the United States

References

Glaciers of the North Cascades
Glaciers of Chelan County, Washington
Glaciers of Washington (state)